John Millen (1804 – October 15, 1843) was a United States Representative and lawyer from Georgia.

Early years and education
Millen was born in Savannah in 1804, of German and Irish descent. He was orphaned at a young age. He studied law, gained admittance to the state bar and practiced law in Savannah. It was said that his practice was quite lucrative, and that his wealth was built upon his legal career.

Political career
Millen served in the Georgia House of Representatives in 1828, 1834, 1835, 1839, and 1840. During his tenure in the Georgia General Assembly, Millen was appointed a Colonel in the State Militia.

In 1843, he was elected as a Democratic Representative, at large, from Georgia to the 28th United States Congress. Millen had pledged to bring more federal assistance to the city of Savannah, and its commercial harbor. He was unable to follow through with that pledge, however, having died only several months after assuming office.

Death and legacy
John Millen's service in Congress was brief, he served from March 4, 1843, until his death, at age 39, October 15, 1843. in Savannah. His illness was brief, just two days in length. He was unmarried, and without children, at the time of his death. His sole heir was his sister. Millen was buried in that city's Laurel Grove Cemetery. There is a cenotaph for him at Congressional Cemetery in Washington, DC.

The town of Millen, the county seat of Jenkins County, Georgia is named after him.

See also
 List of United States Congress members who died in office (1790–1899)

Notes

References

External links
 
  – burial in Laurel Grove Cemetery, Savannah, Georgia
  – cenotaph in the Congressional Cemetery, Washington, DC

1804 births
1843 deaths
Burials in Georgia (U.S. state)
Democratic Party members of the Georgia House of Representatives
Georgia (U.S. state) lawyers
Politicians from Savannah, Georgia
Democratic Party members of the United States House of Representatives from Georgia (U.S. state)
Date of birth missing
19th-century American politicians
American people of German descent
American people of Irish descent
19th-century American lawyers